Ringstead and Addington railway station was a railway station serving Great and Little Addington and Ringstead in Northamptonshire  on the former  Northampton and Peterborough Railway which connected Peterborough and Northampton.

In 1846 the line, along with the London and Birmingham, became part of the London and North Western Railway. At grouping in 1923 it became part of the London Midland and Scottish Railway.

It was notable that the approach from Addington was partly across stepping stones made from former railway sleeper blocks. This still remains although covered in overgrowth.

The former service 
The service was from Peterborough to Northampton via Wellingborough. The station opened in 1845 and closed in 1964 to passengers.

References

External links
 Subterranea Britannica

Disused railway stations in Northamptonshire
Former London and Birmingham Railway stations
Railway stations in Great Britain opened in 1845
Railway stations in Great Britain closed in 1964
Beeching closures in England
John William Livock buildings
North Northamptonshire